This article lists the results for the Wales during the First and Second World War. During this period no caps were awarded.

1914–19

1919

1939–46

1939

1940

1941

1942

1943

1944

1945

1946

Notes
  Some sources report the total attendance as 40,000.

Other unofficial matches

1891

1935

1951

1956

1969

2006

See also

:Category:Wales wartime international footballers
Association football during World War I 
Association football during World War II
1945–46 British Victory Home Championship

References

Bibliography

Notes

External links 
RSSSF: Wales - International Results
Welsh Football Data Archive - Welsh International Matches

1919 in Welsh sport
1939 in Welsh sport
1940 in Welsh sport
1941 in Welsh sport
1942 in Welsh sport
1943 in Welsh sport
1944 in Welsh sport
1945 in Welsh sport 
1940s in Wales
Wartime association football
1939
1919–20 in Welsh football
South
South
Lists of national association football team unofficial results